Leyla Mutallim qizi Guliyeva (née Aliyeva, Azerbaijani: Leyla Mütəllim qızı Quliyeva (Əliyeva), born 1986) is an Azerbaijani television presenter. On 22, 24 and 26 May 2012 she hosted the Eurovision Song Contest 2012 in Baku, Azerbaijan together with Eldar Gasimov and Nargiz Birk-Petersen.

Career
Leyla Aliyeva graduated from the Baku Academy of Music with a degree in choral directing and has a master's degree in music. In 2004, while in her first year of undergraduate studies, she was hired by İTV to work for the channel's Department of Music, Arts and Entertainment. In 2007, she began covering Eurovision news and soon rose to becoming a member of İTV's Eurovision organising committee. Aliyeva also served as the spokesperson of Azerbaijan announcing the country's first voting results in the country's debut at the Eurovision Song Contest 2008 in Belgrade, Serbia. She hosted the Azerbaijani national Eurovision selection tours alongside Husniyya Maharramova in 2011 and 2012.

Personal life
She is married to Abbas Guliyev, a fellow İTV employee who works there as a director, and has a daughter.

See also
List of Eurovision Song Contest presenters

References 

Azerbaijani women television presenters
Azerbaijani television personalities
Baku Academy of Music alumni
1986 births
Living people
People from Baku